The 1996–97 CIS Insurance Rugby Union County Championship was the 97th edition of England's County Championship rugby union club competition. 

Cumbria won their first title (although Cumberland had won the title in 1924). They defeated Somerset in the final.

Final

See also
 English rugby union system
 Rugby union in England

References

Rugby Union County Championship
County Championship (rugby union) seasons